Beautiful Redemption is a 2012 young adult novel by Kami Garcia and Margaret Stohl and the final book in the Caster Chronicles series. 

The book was released on October 23, 2012 by Little, Brown and Company and focuses on Lena's attempts to bring Ethan back from the dead and deal with the aftermath of his death.

In their 2012 Y.A./Middle-Grade Book Awards, the Atlantic Wire awarded the book with the "Best Conclusion" award for having a "beautiful, powerful conclusion".

Plot

Ethan Wate finds himself in the Otherworld’s version of Wate’s Landing, where he sees his mom, Lila Evers Wate. Although Ethan is happy to see his mother again, he longs to be with Lena. To make his presence known, he creates crossword puzzles at Gatlin’s local publication, The Stars & Stripes, to get his messages to Lena.

Ethan's Aunt Prue tells him that his death wasn’t supposed to happen, and, upon consulting Obidias Trueblood, learns that the only way he can return to the Mortal world is to remove his page from The Caster Chronicles held by the Keepers at the Gates of the Far Keep. To get there, he must get two “river eyes” – two perfectly smooth black stones – to get across the Great River and to the Gates, where he must give the Gatekeeper “something he can’t refuse.”
Ethan acquires the first “river eye” from Sulla the prophet, one of the Greats. The second one was given to Lena by her great-aunt Twyla. Making another crossword puzzle in The Stars & Stripes, Ethan acquires the second “river eye”. Ethan is helped along his journey by Uncle Abner's crow, Exu; crows are the only animals capable of crossing one world to the other.

Ethan, with the help of the map given to him by Aunt Prue, navigates the Otherworld and meets the River Master.

Upon reaching the other shore, Ethan meets the Gatekeeper Xavier who demands payment before showing Ethan the Gates. Xavier reveals that he is a former Keeper condemned to be a monster and Gatekeeper for questioning Angelus’ “experiments” – injecting Caster tissue and blood into himself to become immortal. Upon seeing the Book of Stars, the Light equivalent of the Book of Moons, Ethan realizes that the safest place to hide the Book of Moons is with Xavier. Making another crossword puzzle, he asks Lena to give him the Book of Moons.

Upon receiving Ethan’s message asking for the Book of Moons, Lena plans to get to Abraham Ravenwood, the person last known to have the Book. Abraham nearly kills Lena and John on their trip to get the book but are saved by Macon Ravenwood’s intervention. Macon, with his developed Light Caster powers, kills Abraham's protector Hunting with sunlight. While Macon directs the sunlight at Abraham, Link stabs Abraham with his garden shears.

To get The Book of Moons to Ethan, Macon seeks out Amma. In the middle of their ritual, Genevieve Duchannes’ Sheer appears, offering her help in bringing the Book to Ethan. Lena eventually gives the Book to Genevieve, who, in turn, give it to the Greats.

Ethan, while waiting for the Book of Moons, helps Xavier catalogue his many possessions and slowly loses his memories of Lena. When The Book of Moon arrives, however, his memories return. Ethan offers up the book to Xavier as payment, and Xavier takes him to the Gates.

Upon entering, a Keeper tells Ethan that he must go through a labyrinth before entering the Far Keep. In the labyrinth he finds Sarafine surrounded by bones. As a punishment for being so evil while she was alive, Angelus has condemned her to be the Guardian of the labyrinth. Expressing her deep hatred for Angelus, she burned herself to death so that Ethan can get to the Far Keep and kill Angelus himself.

Inside, Ethan is welcomed a hero. Ethan expresses his wish of removing his page from The Caster Chronicles, and Angelus refuses. He reveals that he has re-written several fates of Casters to fulfill his plan of annihilating the Mortals, and that Ethan’s death was not supposed to happen. The apocalypse, which started after Lena’s Seventeenth Moon, should have continued until the world was free of Mortals but was thwarted by the Lilum, who told Ethan what must be done to restore the Order.

Xavier appears as Ethan’s friend and proposes a challenge: the one who reaches the Chronicles first shall do whatever he wishes.
Ethan is separated from The Caster Chronicles by a pool of water. Angelus taunts him with the body of Ethan Carter Wate, Ethan's ancestor who also tried to remove his page from the Chronicles but failed. Ethan reminds Angelus of his own mortality, and Angelus angrily denies it. As proof, Angelus throws himself to the pool full of corpses. Thinking Angelus dead, Ethan finds the bridge and crosses the pool, but is stopped by Angelus, who performed a Cast underwater. Ethan remembers that he has one more “river eye” and throws it at the pool. The corpses go back underwater, and Ethan reaches the island where the Chronicles lies. Ethan removes Angelus' page from the Chronicles, causing Angelus’ death. He finds his own page (written by Obidias as punishment for trying to remove his own page, along with turning one of his hands into snakes) and removes it.

Ethan wakes up back at the water tower where he jumped and sees Amma going upwards, joining the Greats: To fulfill the prophecy, Amma had traded her life for his.
In Gatlin, the news of Amma Treadeau’s death is met with utter disbelief. Lena and Ethan spend their time together. Link and Ridley renewed their on-off relationship, and John and Liv’s relationship continues. Amma, through another crossword puzzle, tells Ethan to "be good".

The book ends with Ethan offering glasses of chocolate milk to Aunt Prue, Twyla, Amma and his mother and, drinking his own glass, remarking that “life has never tasted sweeter

Reception
Entertainment Weekly gives the book a "B+", writing that it did not disappoint. The Manila Bulletin panned Beautiful Redemption as having a "lackluster ending", stating that while all of the loose ends are tied, "it comes at the cost of what made the first three books good".

References

External links

 Official Beautiful Creatures series website
 Cover reveal on EW

2012 American novels
American young adult novels
Young adult fantasy novels
Paranormal romance novels
Little, Brown and Company books
2012 fantasy novels